The 2010–11 season was Videoton FCs 42nd competitive season, 11th consecutive season in the OTP Bank Liga and 69th year in existence as a football club. The club also participated in the Magyar Kupa, Ligakupa and UEFA Europa League.

Transfers

In:

 

Out:

Squad

Out on loan

Competitions

Friendlies

Szuperkupa

OTP Bank Liga

Results summary

Results by round

Results

Table

Magyar Kupa

Final

Ligakupa

Paksi win on away goals

UEFA Europa League

Notes
Note 1: Played in Győr at ETO Park as Videoton's Stadion Sóstói did not meet UEFA criteria.

Squad statistics

Appearances and goals

|-
|colspan="14"|Players who appeared for Videoton that left during the season:

|}

Top scorers

Disciplinary Record

References

External links
 :hu:A Videoton FC 2010–2011-es szezonja
Videoton at Soccerway.com

Fehérvár FC seasons
Videoton